86th Division or 86th Infantry Division may refer to:

 Infantry divisions
 86th Division (1st Formation)(People's Republic of China), 1949–1951
 86th Infantry Division (German Empire)
 86th Division (Imperial Japanese Army)
 86th Rifle Division (Soviet Union)
 86th Infantry Division (United States)

 Aviation divisions
 86th Air Division, a unit of the United States Air Force

See also
 86th Brigade (disambiguation)
 86th Regiment (disambiguation)